Dame Kay Elizabeth Davies  (née Partridge; born 1 April 1951) is a British geneticist. She is Dr Lee's Professor of Anatomy at the University of Oxford and a Fellow of Hertford College, Oxford. She is director of the Medical Research Council (MRC) functional genetics unit, a governor of the Wellcome Trust, a director of the Oxford Centre for Gene Function, and a patron and Senior Member of Oxford University Scientific Society. Her research group has an international reputation for work on Duchenne muscular dystrophy (DMD). In the 1980s, she developed a test which allowed for the screening of foetuses whose mothers have a high risk of carrying DMD.

Early life and education
Davies was born in Stourbridge, Worcestershire, (now West Midlands). She was educated at the Gig Mill School, Stourbridge County High School for Girls, Somerville College, Oxford, and Wolfson College, Oxford.
She was awarded a Doctor of Philosophy degree in 1976 for research on 	the structure and function of chromatin from the slime mould Physarum polycephalum.

Career and research
Davies' research group has an international reputation for work on Duchenne muscular dystrophy (DMD). In the 1980s, she developed a test which allowed for the screening of foetuses whose mothers have a high risk of carrying DMD. DMD occurs when the dystrophin protein fails to express in muscle cells due to a mutation in the gene which codes for the protein. In 1989 Davies discovered that the utrophin protein has similar properties to dystrophin and has since shown in mouse models that up regulation of the former protein in muscle cells can compensate for the absence of latter.

Davies is currently collaborating with European Research Council fellow Dr Peter Oliver investigating neurodegenerative and movement disorders.

Davies is director of the Medical Research Council (MRC) functional genetics unit, a governor of the Wellcome Trust and, with Frances Ashcroft and Peter Donnelly is a director of the Oxford Centre for Gene Function. She was an Executive Editor of the journal Human Molecular Genetics. and stepped down in 2021.

In 2020, together with Richard P. Lifton, she co-chaired a commission report on the contentious subject of Hereditary Human Genome Editing, under the auspices of the National Academies of Sciences, Engineering, and Medicine and the UK Royal Society.

She has published more than 400 papers and won numerous awards for her work. She has been a Governor of the Wellcome Trust since 2008 and became Deputy chairman in 2013-18. She was the recipient of the Women in to Science and Engineering (WISE) Lifetime Achievement Award in 2014.

Her former doctoral students include Irene Miguel-Aliaga and Sonja Vernes.

Award and honours
Davies was a founding Fellow of the Academy of Medical Sciences (FMedSci) in 1998, and was elected a Fellow of the Royal Society in 2003. Already a Commander of the Order of the British Empire (CBE), she was advanced to Dame Commander of the Order of the British Empire (DBE) in the 2008 New Year Honours.

She is an Honorary Fellow, Somerville College, University of Oxford. She gave the inaugural Rose Lecture at Kingston University in 2012 and delivered the Harveian Oration at the Royal College of Physicians in 2013. In 2015, she was awarded the William Allan Award by the American Society of Human Genetics. She was appointed a Patron of The SMA Trust in September 2016.

Davies was awarded the Croonian Lecture by the Royal Society in 2018 for "her achievements in developing a prenatal test for Duchenne muscular dystrophy and for her work characterising the binding partners of the protein dystrophin".

Personal life
Davies continued to work with her former husband, Stephen G. Davies, on scientific projects, even after their separation in 2000. Their son {2006-2015} studied Biology and gained a doctorate at the University of Edinburgh. She married Christopher Williams in 2019.

References

Category:ISI highly cited researchers

1951 births
Living people
Wellcome Trust Principal Research Fellows
Alumni of Somerville College, Oxford
Alumni of Wolfson College, Oxford
British anatomists
British geneticists
Women geneticists
Dames Commander of the Order of the British Empire
Female Fellows of the Royal Society
Fellows of the Academy of Medical Sciences (United Kingdom)
Fellows of Hertford College, Oxford
Academic journal editors
Wellcome Trust
British public health doctors
People from Stourbridge
Oxford University Press Delegate
Dr Lee's Professors of Anatomy
Fellows of the Royal Society
Fellows of Somerville College, Oxford
Professors of Genetics (University of Oxford)
20th-century British non-fiction writers
21st-century British non-fiction writers
Women public health doctors